David Kyles (born December 7, 1989) is an American professional basketball player who last played for Rustavi. He played college basketball for Wichita State University.

Professional career
After going undrafted in the 2012 NBA draft, Kyles signed with Astrum Levice of the Czech National Basketball League. He also played for the team's Slovak Extraliga affiliate, BK Levicki Patriot. In January 2013, he left Levice and signed with BK Inter Bratislava where he managed just three games before leaving the team in February.

In September 2013, Kyles signed with Tuři Svitavy for the 2013–14 season. In January 2014, he left Svitavy and signed with Panelefsiniakos of Greece for the rest of the season.

In September 2014, Kyles signed with AEK Athens for the 2014–15 season. He left the club after just four games. On November 20, 2014, he signed with ETHA Engomis of Cyprus for the rest of the season.

References

External links
 DraftExpress.com Profile
 RealGM.com Profile
 Eurobasket.com Profile

1989 births
Living people
AEK B.C. players
American expatriate basketball people in Cyprus
American expatriate basketball people in the Czech Republic
American expatriate basketball people in Georgia (country)
American expatriate basketball people in Greece
American expatriate basketball people in Slovakia
American men's basketball players
Basketball players from Dallas
BC Rustavi players
BK Inter Bratislava players
BK Patrioti Levice players
Greek Basket League players
Panelefsiniakos B.C. players
Shooting guards
Tuři Svitavy players
Wichita State Shockers men's basketball players